The non-marine molluscs of France are a part of the molluscan fauna of Metropolitan France (including Corsica).

There are 695 species of non-marine molluscs living in the wild in continental France.

Freshwater gastropods 

Hydrobiidae
 Arganiella exilis
 Belgrandia varica (J. Paget, 1854) - It was endemic to France, but it is extinct.
 Belgrandiella pyrenaica
 Bythiospeum articense
 Bythiospeum bourguignati
 Bythiospeum bressanum
 Bythiospeum garnieri
 Fissuria boui
 Litthabitella elliptica
 Palacanthilhiopsis vervierii

Lithoglyphidae
 Lithoglyphus naticoides

Moitessieriidae
 Moitessieria corsica
 Moitessieria juvenisanguis
 Moitessieria lineolata
 Moitessieria locardi
 Moitessieria rolandiana
 Paladilhia pleurotoma
 Plagigeyeria conilis
 Pseudamnicola anteisensis
 Pseudamnicola klemmi
 Spiralix rayi (Locard, 1882)

Amnicolidae
 Bythinella bouloti Girardi, Bichain & Wienin, 2002
 Bythinella galerae Girardi, Bichain & Wienin, 2002

Land gastropods 

Aciculidae
 Renea gormonti
 Renea moutoni
 Renea paillona
 Renea singularis

Chondrinidae
Abida ateni
Abida attenuata
Abida bigerrensis
Abida cylindrica
Abida gittenbergeri
Abida occidentalis
Abida partioti
Abida polyodon
Abida pyrenaearia
Abida vergniesiana

Cochlicopidae
 Cryptazeca subcylindrica
 Hypnophila remyi

Vertiginidae
 Truncatellina arcyensis

Pristilomatidae
 Vitrea pseudotrolli

Parmacellidae
 Parmacella gervaisii Moquin-Tandon, 1850 - It was endemic to France, but it is extinct.

Helicidae
 Cyrnotheba corsica
 Tacheocampylaea raspaili
 Tyrrhenaria ceratina - in Corsica
 Helix melanostoma Draparnaud, 1801

Freshwater bivalves

Unionidae
 Unio turtoni

Hothouse aliens 
"Hothouse aliens" in France include:

See also 
 Fauna of Metropolitan France

French Overseas territories
List of non-marine molluscs of French Guiana
List of non-marine molluscs of French Polynesia
List of non-marine molluscs of Martinique
List of non-marine molluscs of Réunion
List of non-marine molluscs of Guadeloupe
List of non-marine molluscs of Mayotte

Surrounding countries
 List of non-marine molluscs of Belgium
 List of non-marine molluscs of Luxembourg
 List of non-marine molluscs of Germany
 List of non-marine molluscs of Switzerland
 List of non-marine molluscs of Italy
 List of non-marine molluscs of Monaco
 List of non-marine molluscs of Andorra
 List of non-marine molluscs of Spain
 List of non-marine molluscs of Great Britain

References

External links 

Molluscs, non-marine
France
France
France